Baaja (Mouth Organ) is a 2002 Indian Hindi film directed by Apurba Kishore Bir.

Synopsis 
A free and compassionate human spirit is trapped in Shibu, an eleven-year-old boy. In order to guide Shibu's wandering energy on a constructive path, his widow mother sends him to the city from the village, with his uncle. But Shibu's carefree approach to life and his energetic response to reality, makes him a subject of annoyance to the neighbour as well as his own aunt. This forces his uncle to be strict with him and he takes him along to his shoe shop, in order to keep a watch on him, studying. But the situation leads Shibu on a different track. Being asked by the Uncle to carry a pair of shoes to a doctor's residence, Shibu ventures across the streets and lanes in his casual and carefree manner while encountering some stray incidents. But, then something very sudden and unpredictable happens, which invites him to show his true potential and real merit, to surprise the adults, effected by indifferent attitude.

Cast
Yakub Shaikhl
Ram Awana as shibu's uncle
Roni Bhatt
Saroj Bhagwar
Manisha Rajpal
Chitra Pandey

Crew
Director/Script : Apurba Kishore Bir
Story & Screenplay: Apurba Kishore Bir
Cinematography : Apurba Kishore Bir
Music : Bhavdeep Jaipurwale
Editing : Aseem Sinha
Dialogue : Hubnath Pandey
Sound : Nihar Ranjan Samel

Awards & Participation 
National Film Awards 2003  (Best Children Film)

Music 
Bhavdeep Jaipurwale arranged the music for this film.

Review
A. K. Bir too has a child protagonist in Baaja. Shibu is brought from the village to the town to be better educated. The boy's encounters and adventures on the streets bring out his savvy nature and concern for others; they also give him a better understanding of values. Shibu gives first aid to a grandma who has been cudgelled by a thief, minds the wailing baby, finds a doctor, and recovers the stolen gold chain. Since Bir is unable to decide whether to opt for realism or the fairy tale mode, the film hangs uneasily between the two genres.

See also
 National Film Award for Best Children's Film

References

External links

Interview of 'A.K.Bir'in www.filmnirvana.com

2002 films
Indian children's films
2000s Hindi-language films
Best Children's Film National Film Award winners
2000s children's films
Films directed by Apurba Kishore Bir